Carchi is a province in Ecuador. The capital is Tulcán. The Carchi River rises on the slopes of Chiles volcano and forms the boundary between Colombia and Ecuador near Tulcan.  Rumichaca Bridge is the most important land route between Colombia and Ecuador.

Economy 
The provincial economy is based on industrial, and agriculture productions. Carchi produces food, drinks, tobacco, and dairy products. The agriculture sector produces potatoes, maize, etc.

Cantons 
The province is divided into 6 cantons. The following table lists each with its population at the 2010 census, its area in square kilometres (km²), and the name of the canton seat or capital.

Demographics 
Ethnic groups as of the Ecuadorian census of 2010:
Mestizo  86.9%
Afro-Ecuadorian  6.4%
Indigenous  3.4%
White  2.9%
Montubio  0.3%
Other  0.1%

Tourist destinations 

 Tulcán Cemetery - topiary garden cemetery;
 El Ángel ecological reserve, El Ángel - extensive páramo ecosystem with diverse biotopes, including the visually striking páramos de frailejones - moorland with a forest of ancient, up to 10 m tall Espeletia pycnophylla plants;
 Arrayanes Forest, San Gabriel - 16 ha large forest with rare trees whose bark is in cinnamon color;
 Lagunas Verdes on the way from Tufiño to Maldonado. Three lakes of volcanic origin with blue - green water, rich with sulphur;
 Gruta de la Paz, San Gabriel - show cave with a shrine of Virgin Mary;
 Laguna del Salado, San Gabriel - a serene lagoon with translucent water;
 Tufiño Hot Springs, Tulcán;
 "El Voladero" lagoons, El Angel;
 De Paluz Falls, San Gabriel;
 Guanderas Scientific Station, Huaca - a biological research station for montane ecosystems.

See also 
 Provinces of Ecuador
 Cantons of Ecuador

References

External links 

  Gobierno Provincial del Carchi, official website
  ¡Con el Carchi no se juega!
  "DEJA VU" OF HISTORY: YOU DON'T MESS WITH CARCHI 

 
Provinces of Ecuador